Webbie Burnett (born November 7, 1967) is a former American football defensive tackle who played ten seasons in the Arena Football League with the Orlando Predators and Toronto Phantoms. He was drafted by the New Orleans Saints in the eleventh round of the 1990 NFL Draft. Burnett first enrolled at the University of Florida before transferring to Western Kentucky University. He attended Pensacola High School in Pensacola, Florida. He was also a member of the Raleigh-Durham Skyhawks of the World League of American Football. He was named to the Arena Football League 15th Anniversary Team in 2001. Burnett has also been head coach of the Fayetteville Guard of the American Indoor Football Association.

References

External links
Just Sports Stats

Living people
1967 births
Players of American football from Pensacola, Florida
American football defensive tackles
African-American players of American football
Florida Gators football players
Western Kentucky Hilltoppers football players
Raleigh–Durham Skyhawks players
Orlando Predators players
Toronto Phantoms players
21st-century African-American people
20th-century African-American sportspeople